Mindaugas Maldonis (born 30 March 1991) is a Lithuanian sprint canoeist. Competing in the individual K-1 200 m event he won gold in 2021 World Cup stage 2 in Barnaul.

In 2021 Maldonis was selected to represent Lithuania at the 2020 Summer Olympics. At the 2022 ICF Canoe Sprint World Championships Maldonis together with Andrejus Olijnikas won silver medal in K-2 500 m event.

References

External links
 
 

Lithuanian male canoeists
1991 births
Living people
Canoeists at the 2020 Summer Olympics
Olympic canoeists of Lithuania
ICF Canoe Sprint World Championships medalists in kayak